Alexandru Istrate (born 8 May 1947) is a Romanian fencer. He competed in the individual and team épée events at the 1972 Summer Olympics.

References

External links
 

1947 births
Living people
Romanian male fencers
Romanian épée fencers
Olympic fencers of Romania
Fencers at the 1972 Summer Olympics
Sportspeople from Bucharest
20th-century Romanian people
21st-century Romanian people